Bradyporus is a genus of bush crickets, found in south-eastern Europe and western and central Asia.  It is the type genus of the subfamily Bradyporinae and tribe Bradyporini.

Species
Species within this genus include:
subgenus Bradyporus Charpentier, 1825
 Bradyporus dasypus Illiger, 1800 - type species
subgenus Callimenus Fischer von Waldheim, 1830
 Bradyporus avanos Ünal, 2011
 Bradyporus conophallus Ünal, 2011
 Bradyporus dilatatus Stål, 1875
 Bradyporus gocmeni Ünal, 2017
 Bradyporus inexpectatus Ünal, 2019
 Bradyporus karabagi Ünal, 2011
 Bradyporus latipes Stål, 1875
 Bradyporus macrogaster Lefebvre, 1831
 Bradyporus montandoni Burr, 1898
 Bradyporus multituberculatus Fischer von Waldheim, 1833
 Bradyporus oniscus Burmeister, 1838
 Bradyporus sureyai Ünal, 2011
 Bradyporus toros Ünal, 2011

References

External links

Tettigoniidae genera
Bradyporinae